Patrick Alexandre Ernst Loliger Salas (born June 20, 1985) is a Mexican rower who competed at the 2008 Beijing Summer Olympics and the 2012 London Summer Olympics.

Loliger was born in Mexico City. He is the second child of Rolf Loliger (Swiss) and Angelica Salas (Mexican). He grew up in a very family-oriented environment, and began practicing sports at Real Club España. He has a degree in International Business from Tecnológico de Monterrey (Campus Ciudad de Mexico.

Loliger has earned a handful of medals in regattas all around the world, including the Ratzeburger and Wedau Regattas in Germany, the Gent in Belgium, the Paolo D Aloja in Italy, and most recently, he became the first Mexican rower to win a medal at the World University Championship in Kazan, Russia.

He earned two medals at the 2011 Pan American Games in Guadalajara, and his biggest achievement took place in Argentina later than year when he beat his biggest competitor and role model, Santiago Fernández, who placed 4th in the 2005 Athens Summer Olympics.

Exatlón México

Loliger participo en el reality show de TV Azteca Exatlón México en su 2da edición conducida por Antonio Rosique dando cede en República Dominicana, empezando para el atleta olimpico el 13 de agosto del 2018 y terminando mediante un duelo de eliminación el 14 de enero del 2019, Patrick obtuvo un 10° lugar general y 6° varonil además de conseguir 1 presea y un rendimiento de más del 45% de effectividad.

Patrick Loliger "Mexiperro" regreso 2 años después a la competencia deportiva más demandante de la televisión mexicana Exatlón México Titanes vs Héroes en su 4ta temporada, la más grande de su historia. El remero empezó está aventura el 1 de septiembre del 2020 y culminó el 4 de octubre del 2020 logrando un 32° lugar general y 17° varonil.

References

External links
 

1985 births
Mexican male rowers
Olympic rowers of Mexico
Rowers from Mexico City
Rowers at the 2008 Summer Olympics
Rowers at the 2012 Summer Olympics
Rowers at the 2011 Pan American Games
Living people
Pan American Games silver medalists for Mexico
Pan American Games medalists in rowing
Central American and Caribbean Games gold medalists for Mexico
Central American and Caribbean Games silver medalists for Mexico
Competitors at the 2006 Central American and Caribbean Games
Competitors at the 2010 Central American and Caribbean Games
Central American and Caribbean Games medalists in rowing
Medalists at the 2011 Pan American Games
20th-century Mexican people
21st-century Mexican people
Sportspeople from Mexico City